Live Insurrection is a live album by the band Halford, released in Japan on March 28, 2001, and released worldwide in April 2001 with one less track (see 2001 in music). The flag that Rob Halford is kissing on the cover of the album is the Flag of Chile.

Track listing

Notes
 The Japanese release and the 2009 remastered version contains a cover of the Scorpions song "Blackout", featuring guitarist Rudolf Schenker
 "Screaming in the Dark" is a brand new recording
 "Heart of a Lion" and "Prisoner of Your Eyes" are Judas Priest songs that never made it onto any Judas Priest studio album. The original recording of "Prisoner of Your Eyes" (with a different chorus) can be found on the remaster of Screaming for Vengeance, and is featured on the Metalogy box set. The song "Heart of a Lion" originally appeared on the Racer X album Second Heat.
 "Into the Pit", "Nailed to the Gun" and "Life in Black" are originally Fight songs found on War of Words.
 "Light Comes Out of Black" and "Life in Black" are studio songs with added crowd noise. "Light Comes Out of Black" was originally released on the Buffy the Vampire Slayer movie soundtrack, performed by Rob Halford and Pantera.
 "The One You Love to Hate" is a combination of Rob Halford and Bruce Dickinson's soundcheck and live performances from the London LA2 show.

Personnel
Halford
 Rob Halford – vocals
 Patrick Lachman – guitar
 Mike Chlasciak – guitar
 Ray Riendeau – bass
Bobby Jarzombek – drums

Additional performers
 Bruce Dickinson – Co-lead vocals on "The One You Love To Hate"
 Rudolf Schenker – Co-rhythm guitar on "Blackout"

Production
Produced by Roy Z
Executive producer/A&R – John Baxter
Engineered by Eric Kuglin
Mixed by Charlie Bauerfeind and Roy Z
Digital editing – Richard "Guru" Carrette
Additional engineering – Joe "Flo" Floyd
Pre-production digital transfers – Sean White and Jason Southard
Mastered by George Marino (2001)
Remastered by Tom Baker (2006)
Art and design by Marc Sasso (2009 CD release)
Booklet layout/additional art – Attila Juhasz
Photography by Gregg Kozak, Fin Costello, and Ross Halfin

References

2001 live albums
Halford (band) albums
Albums produced by Roy Z